The 1936 Michigan State Normal Hurons football team represented Michigan State Normal College (later renamed Eastern Michigan University) during the 1936 college football season. In their 15th season under head coach Elton Rynearson, the Hurons compiled a record of 6–2 and outscored their opponents by a combined total of 76 to 53. W. Christopher Wilson was the team captain. The team played its home games at Normal Field on the school's campus in Ypsilanti, Michigan.

Schedule

References

Michigan State Normal
Eastern Michigan Eagles football seasons
Michigan State Normal Hurons football